The Jacksonville University Men's Soccer Team is a varsity intercollegiate athletic team of Jacksonville University in Jacksonville, Florida, United States. The team is a member of the ASUN Conference, which is part of the National Collegiate Athletic Association's Division I. Jacksonville's first men's soccer team was fielded in 1957. The team plays its home games at Southern Oak Stadium. The Dolphins are coached by Ali Simmons, who enters his first season in 2023.

The Dolphins have been in several NCAA conferences over their 60-year history. In 1959, the Dolphins won the Florida Intercollegiate Conference. The Dolphins have won three Sun Belt Conference Men's Soccer Tournaments, with one coming in 1987 and the other two coming from 1995–1996. The Dolphins won the ASUN Tournament in 2008 and spring 2021 (part of the rescheduled 2020 season). The Dolphins' best performance in NCAA Division I Men's Soccer Championship came in 1998, where they reached the round of 16.

Roster 
As of December 28, 2020

Coaching Staff
  Ali Simmons– Head Coach
  Thomas Buckner – Associate Head Coach
  Nick Rulle – Assistant Coach

Individual achievements

All-Americans 

Jacksonville has produced four All-Americans. The most recent All-American came in 2000.

Honors 

ASUN Conference
Winners (Tournament) (2): 2008, 2021 Spring
Sun Belt Conference
Winners (Tournament) (3): 1987, 1995, 1996

References

External links
 

 
Jacksonville Dolphins
1957 establishments in Florida
Association football clubs established in 1957